Formally known as the Timor Sea Treaty between the Government of East Timor and the Government of Australia was signed between Australia and East Timor in Dili, East Timor on 20 May 2002, the day East Timor attained its independence from United Nations rule, for joint petroleum exploration of the Timor Sea by the two countries. The signatories of the treaty were then Australian prime minister John Howard and his East Timorese counterpart at that time Mari Alkatiri.

The treaty entered into force on 2 April 2003, following an exchange of diplomatic notes and was backdated to 20 May 2002. The treaty was to run for 30 years from the day it came into force or when a seabed boundary could be established, whichever came earlier. However, the subsequent signing of the Treaty on Certain Maritime Arrangements in the Timor Sea (CMATS) in 2007, the period of validity for the Timor Sea Treaty was extended to 2057, when the validity of CMATS also ends.

The Timor Sea Treaty provides for the sharing of the proceeds of petroleum found in an agreed area of seabed, called the Joint Petroleum Development Area and does not determine the sovereignty and maritime boundary between the two countries. The treaty expressly states that the right of either country to claim the overlapping portion of the seabed is maintained.

The Timor Sea Treaty ceased being in force when the Treaty between Australia and the Democratic Republic of Timor-Leste Establishing Their Maritime Boundaries in the Timor Sea entered into force on 30 August 2019.

Effects of the treaty
The treaty replaces the Timor Gap Treaty which was signed between Australia and Indonesia on 11 December 1989, which was no longer valid once the territory of East Timor ceased to be a province of Indonesia. It virtually puts East Timor in the place of Indonesia in the Timor Gap Treaty but with a few differences.

The significant difference between the Timor Gap Treaty and Timor Sea Treaty is that the latter only creates one Joint Petroleum Development Area, with East Timor getting 90% and Australia 10% of the revenue derived from the area. The former created three zones, with the revenue of the middle Zone of Cooperation being divided equally between the two countries.

See also
Australia–East Timor border
Sunrise International Unitization Agreement (Sunrise IUA)
Timor Gap
Timor Gap Treaty
Treaty on Certain Maritime Arrangements in the Timor Sea (CMATS)

References

Notes

Further reading

External links
 Robert J. King, Submission to the Senate Economics Legislation Committee on the provisions of the Timor Sea Maritime Boundaries Treaty, January 2019

Timor Sea
Australia–East Timor border
Boundary treaties
Commercial treaties
Joint development areas
Treaties of Australia
Treaties of East Timor
2002 in East Timor
2002 in Australia
Treaties concluded in 2002
Treaties entered into force in 2003
2000s establishments in East Timor
2002 in Australian law